Julian Ocleppo (born 1 August 1997) is an Italian tennis player.

Ocleppo has a career high ATP singles ranking of 309 achieved on 24 February 2020. He also has a career high doubles ranking of 167 achieved on 23 July 2018.

Ocleppo has won 3 ATP Challenger doubles titles on the 2018 ATP Challenger Tour in Italy. He made his main draw debut on the ATP World Tour at the 2018 Italian Open doubles competition partnering Andrea Vavassori.

Challenger and Futures/World Tennis Tour finals

Singles: 3 (1–2)

Doubles: 24 (14–10)

Personal life
He is the son of former tennis player Gianni Ocleppo and Dee Ocleppo Hilfiger. His mother is of Turkish and British descent..

He is the stepson of fashion mogul Tommy Hilfiger, through Dee's 2008 marriage.

External links
 

1997 births
Living people
Italian people of British descent
Italian people of Turkish descent
Italian male tennis players
People from Monte Carlo
People of Piedmontese descent
Monegasque male tennis players